Rowes Run is an unincorporated community and census-designated place in Redstone Township, Fayette County, Pennsylvania, United States. As of the 2010 census, its population was 564. The community was part of the Grindstone-Rowes Run CDP before it was split into two separate CDPs for the 2010 census.

History
Rowes Run was founded in 1907 by the Pittsburgh Coal Company. Also known as "New Hill", it was named for a stream that ran through property owned by James Rowe, a prominent figure in the area. The mine located in the town was known as Colonial #3. In 1911, the town was acquired by the H. C. Frick Coke Company.

Geography
Rowes Run is located in northwestern Fayette County, at the northern end of Redstone Township. It is bordered to the north, across Grindstone Road, by the community of Grindstone. Redstone Creek forms the northern border of the Rowes Run CDP east of Grindstone Road.

Notable person
Bobby Locke, baseball player

References

External links 
Rowes Run, PA coal patch town

Census-designated places in Fayette County, Pennsylvania
Census-designated places in Pennsylvania